El Carrascalejo is a municipality located in the province of Badajoz, Extremadura, Spain. According to the 2014 census, the municipality has a population of 68 inhabitants.

References

External links

Municipalities in the Province of Badajoz